An floodlit trail (Norwegian: Lysløype) (Swedish: Elljusspår) is an electrically illuminated trail, often completely or partly in a forest.

Trails 
During seasons with bare ground the floodlit trails are used for among other jogging and walking. They often take the form of landscaped trails with gravel or woodchips as a surface layer. In wintertime skiing trails are groomed on many of them, if the snow conditions allow it. During this time, when the snow is groomed, jogging and walking is strongly discouraged.

Sweden 
Most of the floodlit trails  were constructed during the 1970s. , there are about 1700 illuminated trails in Sweden.

Gallery

References

External links 
Swedish Ski Association manual  All chapters of the manual on how to construct ski tracks and trails

Outdoor recreation
Lighting
Cross-country skiing
Walking